SingStar ABBA is a singing/voice simulation video game released in 2008 for the PlayStation 2 and PlayStation 3.  It was the first band specific SingStar game, followed by SingStar Queen in 2009.

Development
David Reeves, president of Sony Computer Entertainment Europe, said of the release: "We are thrilled to be collaborating with ABBA to bring their tracks to SingStar this Christmas... The popularity of this iconic band continues year after year, and we know SingStar fans will be delighted to add this selection of classics tracks to their SingStar collection".

Patrick Foster of The Times reported that "Bocu, the British music publisher that acquired the British rights to ABBA’s songs more than 30 years ago... collaborated with Sony to release Singstar Abba".

Gameplay
Arnold Katayev of PSXtreme explained that the game "uses a very clean user interface, one that even a five-year-old can navigate. You can either play a practice session, or play for points and attempt to score the best record", further adding: "The object is to fill the bars on screen with accuracy by singing as accurately as possible. If you go flat, you'll get color below the bar; likewise, if you go sharp, you'll get color above the bar. It's a very intuitive system, and figuring out how it works doesn't take any longer than 10 seconds".

Track list
The PlayStation 2 version of the game features 20 songs whereas the PlayStation 3 version features 25 songs.

Reception

The game received "mixed or average reviews" on both platforms according to the review aggregation website Metacritic.

References

External links
 

2008 video games
ABBA
Band-centric video games
EyeToy games
Karaoke video games
London Studio games
Multiplayer and single-player video games
PlayStation 2 games
PlayStation 3 games
SingStar
Sony Interactive Entertainment games
Video games based on musicians
Video games developed in the United Kingdom
sv:SingStar ABBA